Heteraneflus castaneus is a species of beetle in the family Cerambycidae, the only species in the genus Heteraneflus.

References

Hesperophanini